The 2008 Zemmouri bombing occurred on August 9, 2008 when a suicide bomber drove and detonated a vehicle laden with explosives into the headquarters of the Gendarmerie Nationale in the town of Zemmouri, Boumerdès Province, Algeria killing 8 and injuring 19. The Al-Qaeda Organization in the Islamic Maghreb is suspected as being responsible.

See also
 Terrorist bombings in Algeria
 List of terrorist incidents, 2008

References

Boumerdès Province
Suicide car and truck bombings in Algeria
Mass murder in 2008
Terrorist incidents in Algeria
Terrorist incidents in Algeria in 2008
2008 murders in Algeria
Islamic terrorism in Algeria